The Generalized vector space model is a generalization of the vector space model used in information retrieval. Wong et al. presented an analysis of the problems that the pairwise orthogonality assumption of the vector space model (VSM) creates. From here they extended the VSM to the generalized vector space model (GVSM).

Definitions

GVSM introduces term to term correlations, which deprecate the pairwise orthogonality assumption. More specifically, the factor considered a new space, where each term vector ti was expressed as a linear combination of 2n vectors mr where r = 1...2n.

For a document dk and a query q the similarity function now becomes:

where ti and tj are now vectors of a 2n dimensional space.

Term correlation  can be implemented in several ways. For an example, Wong et al. uses the term occurrence frequency matrix obtained from automatic indexing as input to their algorithm. The term occurrence  and the output is the term correlation between any pair of index terms.

Semantic information on GVSM

There are at least two basic directions for embedding term to term relatedness, other than exact keyword matching, into a retrieval model:
 compute semantic correlations between terms
 compute frequency co-occurrence statistics from large corpora

Recently Tsatsaronis focused on the first approach.

They measure semantic relatedness (SR) using a thesaurus (O) like WordNet. It considers the path length, captured by compactness (SCM), and the path depth, captured by semantic path elaboration (SPE).
They estimate the  inner product by:

where si and sj are senses of terms ti and tj respectively, maximizing .

Building also on the first approach, Waitelonis et al. have computed semantic relatedness from Linked Open Data resources including DBpedia as well as the YAGO taxonomy.
Thereby they exploits taxonomic relationships among semantic entities in documents and queries after named entity linking.

References 

Vector space model